The Ohio Women's Methodist Seminary was a seminary located in Delaware, Ohio.

The seminary provided general educational opportunities to women in an era when co-educational institutions of higher learning were not yet fully open to students of both sexes. The Women's Seminary was governed by a board of directors chosen by the Methodist Episcopal Church, which oversaw the operation, and ensured that the curriculum was in keeping with church teachings.

In 1855, funds for the Seminary's first and only institutional building were obtained from Mary Monnett (later Mary Monnett Bain), a student who attended the school. The resulting building, Monnett Hall, was named for her.  Monnett Hall was razed in the late 1970s and the site is now occupied by Monnett Gardens.

See also
 List of current and historical women's universities and colleges

Defunct private universities and colleges in Ohio
United Methodist seminaries
Methodist schools in the United States
Buildings and structures in Delaware, Ohio
Women in Ohio
Christian schools in Ohio